Nimish Pilankar ( – 24 November 2019) was an Indian sound editor who worked on many films.

Biography
Pilankar first work in Bollywood was Race 3. He also worked in films like Kesari and Housefull 4.

Pilankar died of brain haemorrhage on 24 November 2019 at the age of 29.

Selected filmography
 Race 3 (2018)
 Jalebi (2018)
 Ek Ladki Ko Dekha Toh Aisa Laga (2019)
 Kesari (2019) 
 Housefull 4 (2019) 
 Bypass Road (2019)
 Marjaavaan (2019)

References

External links

Indian sound designers
1990s births
2019 deaths
Place of birth missing
Place of death missing